James F. "Jim" Amos (born November 12, 1946) is a retired United States Marine Corps four-star general who served as the 35th commandant of the Marine Corps. As a naval aviator, Amos commanded the 3rd Marine Aircraft Wing during the Iraq War in 2003 and 2006. He served as the 31st assistant commandant of the Marine Corps from 2008 to 2010, and was the first Marine Corps aviator to serve as commandant.

Early life and education
The son of a career navy pilot, Amos was born on November 12, 1946, in Wendell, Idaho. He graduated from the University of Idaho in 1970 with a Bachelor of Science degree in finance and economics, and was commissioned as an ensign in the United States Navy through Naval Reserve Officers Training Corps on January 23, 1970. He attended pilot training in Pensacola, Florida, and was designated a Naval Aviator on November 23, 1971. He was promoted to lieutenant junior grade in December 1971, and was subsequently granted an inter-service transfer to the United States Marine Corps in 1972.

Marine career
Joining Marine Fighter Attack Squadron 212 (VMFA-212) in the spring of 1972, Amos's ensuing operational assignments included tours with VMFA-235, VMFA-232, and VMFA-122, where he flew the F-4 Phantom II. In the fall of 1978, Amos left the active Marine Corps to become a commercial pilot for Braniff International Airways. He was employed with Braniff for 25 months, returning to the Marine Corps in January 1981.

After a three-year posting as a flight instructor in advanced jet training, attendance at the Armed Forces Staff College in Norfolk, Virginia, as a major, and a 13-month overseas staff assignment to the III Marine Amphibious Force, Okinawa, Japan, Amos was transferred to Marine Aircraft Group 24, Kaneohe Bay, Hawaii. Promoted to lieutenant colonel, he assumed command of Marine Air Base Squadron 24, later re-designated as Marine Wing Support Squadron 173. Joining VMFA-212, in 1987, Lieutenant Colonel Amos deployed to the Western Pacific as the squadron's executive officer for what would be called "Operation Last Dance," the last overseas deployment of the Marine F-4 Phantom before it was phased out and retired.

Transitioning to the F/A-18 Hornet in the spring of 1990, Amos assumed command of the Marine Fighter Attack Squadron 312 VMFA-312, and took delivery of 12 new F/A-18C aircraft, becoming the Marine Corps’ first single-seat Night Attack Hornet squadron. The squadron's strong performance was recognized in 1993 with the awarding of the Marine Corps Aviation Association's Hanson Trophy, recognizing 312 as the Marine Corps' top fighter/attack squadron. Following a two-year staff instructor assignment at Quantico, Virginia, where he was promoted to Colonel, Amos took command of Marine Aircraft Group 31, Beaufort, South Carolina in May 1996.

Promoted to brigadier general in 1998, Amos was assigned to NATO as the deputy commander, Naval Striking Forces, Southern Europe in Naples, Italy.  During this tour, he commanded NATO's Kosovo Verification and Coordination Center in Skopje, Macedonia, and later served as the Chief of Staff, U.S. Joint Task Force Noble Anvil during the air campaign over Yugoslavia and Kosovo. Transferred to the Pentagon in the summer of 2000, Amos' other one-star assignments included posting as the Assistant Deputy Commandant for Aviation in 2000, and the Assistant Deputy Commandant for Plans, Policies and Operations in 2001.

In August 2002, Amos was promoted to major general and assumed command of the 15,000 Marines of the 3rd Marine Aircraft Wing based out of Miramar, California, leading them in combat twice between 2003 and 2004 during Operations Iraqi Freedom I and II. Receiving his third star in 2004, Lieutenant General Amos assumed command of the 45,000+ Marines and sailors of the II Marine Expeditionary Force at Camp Lejeune, North Carolina. In 2006, he was reassigned as the commanding general, Marine Corps' Combat Development Command, and as the deputy commandant for combat development and integration, at Quantico, Virginia, where he was responsible for the training of all Marines, their combat units, their continuing education, and for the identification of all Marine equipment requirements.

Receiving his fourth star in July 2008, Amos assumed duties as the 31st Assistant Commandant of the Marine Corps, based at the Pentagon in Arlington, Virginia. In June 2010, Amos was recommended Secretary of Defense Robert Gates for nomination as the 35th Commandant of the Marine Corps. Amos was nominated by President Barack Obama on July 20, who interviewed him for the job on June 17. and confirmed by the Senate Armed Services Committee on September 21, and confirmed shortly thereafter. On October 22, 2010, in a ceremony at Marine Barracks, Washington, D.C., Amos assumed the position as commandant. This marked the first time a Marine aviator had held the position of commandant, and the first time since 1983 that a sitting assistant commandant had moved up to become commandant.

During his tenure as commandant, Amos completed the corps' combat mission in Afghanistan. Facing sequestration and the significant effects of the Budget Control Act, he fought to re-balance the corps during the period of marked fiscal austerity, all while ensuring the combat readiness of the Marine Corps for its continued role as our nation's Expeditionary Crisis Response Force. Responding to multiple global challenges that had been critically acclaimed as "the new normal," he established Special Purpose – Marine Air Ground Task Force-Crisis Response commands in both Africa and the Middle East, while adding 1,000 Marine Security Guards to America's embassies around the world. Additionally, during his final two years as commandant, he shepherded the corps' considerable efforts to address head-on its many challenges in recruiting and maintaining a diverse and talented body of marines. Lastly, he significantly raised the requirements and capacity within the Marine Corps University for all marines to attend resident Professional Military Education.

On October 17, 2014, at Marine Corps Barracks Washington, Amos relinquished command to General Joseph Dunford, who became the 36th Commandant of the Marine Corps. Secretary of the Navy Ray Mabus awarded Amos the Navy Distinguished Service Medal for his service as commandant and Secretary of Defense Chuck Hagel awarded him with the Defense Distinguished Service Medal for over 42 years of distinguished service.
Amos retired from active duty on 1 December 2014.

Tenure as commandant

F-35B, Joint Strike Fighter (JSF)
In November 2010, shortly after becoming commandant, Amos, along with the Chief of Naval Operations and the Chief of Staff of the United States Air Force, were notified of an over $4 billion shortfall in the JSF Program. Reacting to this and the steadily rising costs and delays in the program, Secretary of Defense Robert Gates called a meeting with Secretary of the Navy Ray Mabus and Amos, ostensibly to cancel the Marine variant, the F-35B. Amos was successful in convincing Gates of the corps' need for the aircraft, choosing rather to place the F-35B on a two-year probation to allow the program to mature and right itself. Amos' detailed and hands-on actions over the next 18 months ensured positive progress on the Marine variant in most areas of concern, resulting in Secretary Leon Panetta removing the F-35B from probation six months early. As a result, the Marine Corps was the first service to be able to stand up and operationally certify a Joint Strike Fighter squadron within the DoD.

Shipbuilding and amphibious ships
After a decade plus of declining amphibious ship numbers in the U.S. Navy inventory, and increasing operational requirements for marines around the world, Amos partnered with the Chief of Naval Operations, the Navy Secretariat, and industry to reconfirm amphibious ship requirements, acceptable readiness levels, and total hull numbers.  Working closely with the United States Congress, in the Senate and the House over two years of budgetary efforts, Congress authorized and appropriated monies to buy a, not-programmed, 12th San Antonio Class LPD amphibious war ship.  Additionally, a memorandum of understanding was signed by the Chief of Naval Operations, the Secretary of the Navy, and Amos agreeing to recapitalizing the Navy's more than 40-year-old LSD amphibious ships with the new, and proven, San Antonio Class hull design.  This single agreement alone will result in millions of dollars saved over the lifetime of the LSD replacement effort, and will accelerate the completion and delivery of the ships years ahead of schedule.

Montford Point Marines and the Congressional Gold Medal
In 2012, Amos partnered with key legislators In the US House and US Senate to bring national recognition to the service and sacrifices of the corps' African American Montford Point Marines with the awarding of the Congressional Gold Medal. African-American men were recruited into the Marine Corps under President Roosevelt's orders beginning in 1942.  Establishing a segregated boot camp on a swampy point of land in Jacksonville, North Carolina known as Montford Point, the Marine Corps trained some 20,000 African American men between 1942 and 1949.  Commandant of the Marine Corps, General Alexander Vandegrift, closed down the segregated training in 1949, stating "The experiment with the negro Marines is over. They are Marines …Period!" The Montford Point Marines served in the Pacific during WWII, and again in 1951 during the Korean War.  Their unique service to the United States had never been recognized at the national level until Amos initiated efforts to have them awarded the Congressional Gold Medal.  Final authorization was signed and the medal struck on November 23, 2011, recognizing the Montford Point Marines.

Revising Marine Corps ethics
Sensing that 10 years of sustained combat may have begun fraying the edges of the corps' moral fabric, Amos initiated an effort to morally and ethically "reground the corps."  The effort, named the "Reawakening", targeted the corps' central leadership cadre, the Non-Commissioned Officer (NCO). Amos and Sergeant Major Micheal Barrett, the Sergeant Major of the Marine Corps, spent the better part of 2013 traveling to most every Marine base to personally challenge the corps' NCO leadership with getting back to the basics.  The sole focus of the Reawakening was simply to remind marines of their higher calling. Amos reinforced "who they were" as marines, "what they did for the nation", and "who they were not".

Repeal of don't ask, don't tell
As commandant, Amos opposed the repeal of the "don't ask, don't tell" policy regarding homosexuals openly serving in the U.S. military. After President Obama signed the legislation setting the conditions for repeal, Amos led the Department of Defense in carrying out the will of the nation's civilian leadership.  In late November 2011, Amos stated that his opposition to gays openly serving in the military has proven unfounded and said that marines have embraced the change, describing the repeal as a "non-event."

Personal life

Since retiring from the Marine Corps, Amos has joined the board of directors of the Lord Corporation, a defense contractor. He currently serves as chairman of the board of the Semper Fi Fund.

Awards and decorations
Amos holds the rifle sharpshooter and several awards of the pistol expert marksmanship badges.

See also

List of United States Marine Corps four-star generals

Notes

References

External links

1946 births
United States Marine Corps personnel of the Iraq War
Living people
Recipients of the Navy Distinguished Service Medal
Recipients of the Legion of Merit
United States Marine Corps generals
University of Idaho alumni
People from Wendell, Idaho
Military personnel from Idaho
Recipients of the Defense Superior Service Medal
Assistant Commandants of the United States Marine Corps
United States Marine Corps Commandants
Recipients of the Order of the Golden Fleece (Georgia)
Commercial aviators